James Paul Montgomery (born January 24, 1955) is an American former competition swimmer, four-time Olympic medalist, and former world record-holder.  Montgomery was the first man to break the 50-second barrier (49.99) in the 100-meter freestyle,  at the 1976 Summer Olympics in Montreal, Quebec, where he won three gold medals and one bronze.

Montgomery won five gold medals in freestyle events at the first World Championships in 1973 in Belgrade. From Yugoslavia, Montgomery went on to Indiana University, where he swam for Doc Counsilman for four years, during which time he competed in the 1976 Montreal Olympic Games winning three golds and one bronze in the summer between his junior and senior years.

He founded the Dallas Masters swim program in 1981 and later renamed it the Lone Star Masters. In 1990, the name officially became Baylor/Lone Star Masters. He began teaching swim lessons in 2007, including a class to help adults get past their fear of water.
 
He was inducted into the International Swimming Hall of Fame in 1986 as an Honor Swimmer.

Renaming the Lone Star Masters team, he founded the Dallas Aquatic Masters club team in 2002 with partner and fellow coach, former SMU swimmer Bobby Patten.  In the same year, he was named U.S. Masters Swimming (USMS) Coach of the Year.

While continuing to coach part time at Dallas Aquatic Masters, he coached varsity swimming at the Greenhill School in Addison, Texas from 1999 to 2015. He resigned Greenhill in 2015 to launch the Jim Montgomery Swim School on Preston Road in Dallas.

See also

 List of Indiana University (Bloomington) people
 List of multiple Olympic gold medalists at a single Games
 List of Olympic medalists in swimming (men)
 List of World Aquatics Championships medalists in swimming (men)
 World record progression 100 metres freestyle
 World record progression 4 × 100 metres freestyle relay
 World record progression 4 × 100 metres medley relay
 World record progression 4 × 200 metres freestyle relay

References

Bibliography
 Mastering Swimming / Your guide for fitness, training, and competition, by Jim Montgomery/Mo Chambers, Human Kinetics Publishers, 2008-10-24,

External links
 
 
 
 jmswim.com – Official Website of Jim Montgomery Swim School

1955 births
Living people
American male freestyle swimmers
American swimming coaches
World record setters in swimming
Indiana Hoosiers men's swimmers
Olympic bronze medalists for the United States in swimming
Olympic gold medalists for the United States in swimming
Sportspeople from Madison, Wisconsin
Swimmers at the 1976 Summer Olympics
World Aquatics Championships medalists in swimming
Medalists at the 1976 Summer Olympics